Back to New Orleans or variants may refer to:

Back to New Orleans, The Real World: New Orleans (2010), MTV

Music

Albums
Back to New Orleans, Brownie McGhee & Sonny Terry, 1973
Take Me Back to New Orleans, Chris Barber, 1980
Goin' Back to New Orleans, Dr. John, 1992
Take Me Back to New Orleans, Gary U.S. Bonds, 1995

Songs
"Back to New Orleans" by Lightnin' Hopkins, written Brownie McGhee & Sonny Terry